The 1930 Kansas gubernatorial election took place on November 4, 1930. Harry H. Woodring was elected Governor of Kansas, becoming only the fourth member of the Democratic Party to hold the position in state history. He won with only 34.96% of the vote, with the remainder being split between Republican candidate Frank Haucke and independent write-in candidate John R. Brinkley. Woodring's final margin of victory over Haucke was just 251 votes, or 0.04 percent. The incumbent governor, Republican Clyde M. Reed, was defeated for renomination.

Campaign and voting controversy
After losing his medical and broadcast licenses, "goat-gland doctor" John R. Brinkley decided to run for governor, a position that would enable him to appoint his own members to the medical board and thus regain his right to practice medicine. He began his candidacy in September 1930, just three days after he lost his medical license. He used his radio station to help his campaign, including recruiting a country music star to campaign for him. He also made use of several other publicity stunts. Brinkley campaigned on a vague program that included public works (a state lake in every county), education (free textbooks for public schoolchildren and increased educational opportunities for African Americans), lower taxes, and old-age pensions.

Because Brinkley announced his campaign so late, he had to run as a write-in candidate. Three days before the election, the Attorney General of Kansas (a known opponent) announced that the rules surrounding write-in candidates had changed, and that Brinkley's name could only be written in in one specific way for the vote to count (as "J. R. Brinkley"). An article published at the time in The Des Moines Register estimated that between 30,000 and 50,000 ballots were disqualified in this manner. The successful candidate, Woodring, later admitted he would have lost had all of Brinkley's votes been counted.

Results
Woodring won 39 counties (including Rawlins County by a single vote), Haucke won 38 counties, and Brinkley 28 counties.

See also
 List of third party performances in United States gubernatorial elections

References

1930
Gubernatorial
Kansas
November 1930 events